The .50-70 Government (also called the .50-70 Musket and .50 Government) is a black powder cartridge adopted in 1866 for the Springfield Model 1866 trapdoor rifle.

Description
Derived from the .50-60-400 Joslyn, the cartridge was developed after the unsatisfactory results of the .58 rimfire cartridge for the Springfield Model 1865 rifle. The .50-70 Government cartridge became the official cartridge of the U.S. military until replaced by the .45-70 Government in 1873.  The .50-70 cartridge has a pressure limit of 22,500 PSI.

The official designation of this cartridge at the time of introduction was "US center-fire metallic cartridge", and the commercial designation  .50-70-450, standing for :
Caliber: .50
Powder charge:  black powder
Bullet weight: 

The U.S. Navy purchased Remington Rolling Block rifles chambered for the .50-70 cartridge.

The U.S. Army ordered both rolling-block rifles and carbines in caliber .50-70 and made some rolling blocks at their Springfield Armory facility in this caliber. The U.S. Army also had a large supply of percussion-fired Sharps carbines at the close of the Civil War and had the Sharps Rifle Company convert about 31,000 of those to caliber .50-70 for cavalry use. Meanwhile, the Army, which had exited the Civil War with an inventory of almost a million percussion-fired muzzleloaders, converted Springfield Model 1863 and Model 1864 muskets to metallic cartridge ammunition using the Allin conversion (trapdoor) method, as well as cadet rifles. The first of the .50-70 conversions was the Springfield Model 1866.  Newer improved versions were made and used by the Army through 1873. After 1873, with the advent of the .45-70 cartridge, the Army declared the .50-70 to be surplus, and while some rifles in .50-70 were issued to Indian Scouts, the bulk were simply sold off as surplus. In the U.S. Navy, however, the .50-70 cartridge and the guns associated with it remained in use until the late 1880s.

Buffalo Bill used a Springfield Model 1866 in caliber .50-70 while hunting buffalo to feed the track workers of the Kansas Pacific Railway. General George Custer was known to have had and used a sporterized rolling block in caliber .50-70 and was believed to have had it with him at the Battle of the Little Bighorn.

As Army General Philip Sheridan had embarked on a plan to eliminate the bison during the course of the American Indian Wars, the .50-70 rifles were also issued or purchased by buffalo hunters for use in eliminating the vast bison herds. Sharps began manufacturing sporterized rifles in .50-70 (and later .50-90, .50-110, etc.) and with improved sights for longer range shots for use by the buffalo hunters. In 1867 the .50-70 cartridge in U.S. Army Model of 1866 Springfield rifles played a pivotal role in holding off an attacking force of 300-1,000 Lakota Sioux Indians during the Wagon Box Fight.

Modern-made functional replicas of caliber .50-70 historical rifles have been imported into the US by such firms as Davide Pedersoli and A. Uberti, Srl. (a Beretta subsidiary). The caliber of .50-70 still enjoys some use and popularity with sportsmen and cowboy action shooters.

See also

 List of rifle cartridges
 13 mm caliber

References

External links 
 Gaining respect for the .50/70 Government
 .50-70 Government

Pistol and rifle cartridges
Military cartridges
Rimmed cartridges